Romadanovka is a rural locality (a selo) in Verkhotorsky Selsoviet, Ishimbaysky District, Bashkortostan, Russia. The population was 176 as of 2010. There are 3 streets.

Geography 
Romadanovka is located 32 km southeast of Ishimbay (the district's administrative centre) by road. Kuznetsovsky is the nearest rural locality.

References 

Rural localities in Ishimbaysky District